KPTW may refer to:

 KPTW (TV), a television station (channel 8, virtual 6) licensed to Casper, Wyoming, United States
 The ICAO code for Heritage Field Airport
 a mnemonic device for recalling four lowercase, subordinate soil horizon distinctions (in US Soil Taxonomy) that can occur in dry agricultural settings: 
k represents an accumulation of carbonate salts (e.g., Bk), 
p represents a disturbance such as plowing (e.g., Ap), 
t represents an accumulation of silicate clays (e.g., Bt), 
w represents an initial transformation or weathering of parent material (e.g., Bw)